Subuliniscus is a genus of small, tropical, air-breathing land snails, terrestrial pulmonate gastropod mollusks in the family Achatinidae.

Species 
The genus Subuliniscus includes the following species:
 Subuliniscus arambourgi Germain
 Subuliniscus lucasi Pilsbry, 1919
 "Subuliniscus species A" from Uganda

References 

 
Taxonomy articles created by Polbot